Family Way is a 2012 Dutch comedy film directed by Joram Lürsen. It is a sequel to Alles is Liefde.

Cast
Carice van Houten as Winnie de Roover
Benja Bruijning as Charlie de Roover
Thijs Römer as Rutmer de Roover
Jacob Derwig as Dick Tasman
Martine Bijl as Jeannette de Roover
Kees Hulst as Arend de Roover

See also
 Pregnancy (for which the phrase "in the family way" is a euphemism).

References

External links 

2012 comedy films
2012 films
Dutch comedy films